The House of Queiroz is an aristocratic and noble family of Portugal. The Queiroz family is one of the 72 houses of the Portuguese high nobility, displayed at the Palace of Sintra(Portuguese: Palácio de Sintra) in the Sala de Sintra(English: Sintra's Room). The room was created by the King Dom Manuel I to organize the coat or arms of the most important families in the Portuguese nobility.

History 
Family descended, by legitimate maleness, from Custódio de Queiros Pessanha de Sampaio, born in Vila Meã, parish of Salvador, Archbishopric of Braga, and from his wife D. Luísa Maria Ferreira de Carvalho. Grandparents of Dr. Joaquim José de Queiroz e Almeida, born in Quintãs (Eixo), graduated in law, judge of the Palace, minister of State, Councilor of State, professed knight in the no. de Cristo, knight, nobleman of the coat of arms of the House of Queiroz. The Doctor Joaquim José de Queiroz e Almeida married D.Teodora Joaquina de Almeida, from whom he had Dr. José Maria de Almeida Teixeira de Queiroz, graduated in law from the University of Coimbra, peer of the elective Kingdom (by Aveiro), counselor judge of the Supreme Court of Justice. Later he married D. Maria Carolina Augusta Pereira d'Eça, daughter of Coronel José António Pereira d'Eça and wife D. Ana Clementina de Abreu e Castro. They were the parents of the eminent writer José Maria d'Eça de Queiroz.

Notable members of the family

Eça de Queiroz 
José Maria de Eça de Queiroz(Póvoa de Varzim, November 25, 1845 – Neuilly-sur-Seine, August 16 1900), also spelled Eça de Queirós, was a Portuguese writer and diplomat. He is considered one of the most important Portuguese writers of all time. He was the author of novels of recognized importance, Os Maias and O Crime do Padre Amaro. Os Maias is considered by many to be the best Portuguese realist novel of the 19th century.

Eça de Queiroz and Machado de Assis are considered the two greatest Portuguese-language writers of the 19th century. Eça was notable for the originality and richness of his style and language, his descriptive realism; and for the constant social criticism in his novels. The term "acaciano" to define someone with an empty speech, decorated, pompous, but without content, present in the Portuguese language, is an allusion to the character Conselheiro Acácio, from the novel O Primo Basílio.

Antônio de Queiroz Telles, Baron of Jundiaí 
Antônio de Queirós Teles, first baron of Jundiaí, (Jundiaí, February 1, 1789 – Campinas, October 11, 1870) was a Brazilian landowner and politician. Producer of coffee and sugar cane, owner of the large estate called "Sítio Grande", which he later divided into large lots, donating them to his children, origin of the São Luís, Buritis, Boa Vista, Santa Gertrudes farms and others. He was a justice of the peace, councilor, member of the provincial assembly, deputy and police chief. Father of Antônio de Queirós Teles, Count of Parnaíba, Joaquim Benedito de Queirós Teles, Baron of Japi, and of Ana Joaquina do Prado Fonseca, Second Baroness of Jundiaí. He was one of the defenders of the construction of highways, so he was entrusted by the government the task of supervising the road between São Paulo and Campinas.

Born in Vila de Jundiaí on February 1, 1789, the legitimate son of the chief guard Antonio de Queiroz Telles and Dona Anna Joaquina da Silva Prado, important and wealthy farmers in the municipality.

Like his parents, he dedicated himself to farming, but his intelligent and patriotic spirit, combined with a robust organization, could not be limited to farming work alone; in addition to his extreme love for his native land, he did everything for the benefit of his locality.

The merits of Antonio Queiroz Telles were generally recognized, while popular suffrage always gave him first place in the elections for justices of the peace, councilor, voter and member of the provincial assembly, the government for its part distinguished him with places of trust. Such as municipal judge and orphans, police chief, successively knight, officer and commander of the Imperial Ordem da Rosa, and recognized his services by awarding him the title of Baron of Jundiaí.

As an important farmer that he was and recognizing those good roads are the main artery that gives life to this important branch of industry, an almost exclusive source for the progress of Brazil at that time, Antonio de Queiroz Telles was always tireless in promoting both in the Assembly and before the Government for the construction of a good road between Jundiaí and Santos and during almost all his life he was charged by the Provincial Government to inspect and supervise part of the road between São Paulo and Campinas.

In 1846, when His Majesty Emperor D. Pedro II visited Jundiaí, Antonio de Queiroz Telles had the honor of hosting him in his house, and he did so with the frankness and magnificence that everyone expected from his highly chivalrous spirit.

The Baron of Jundiaí died in Campinas on the 11th day of October 1870. He was married to D. Anna Liduina de Moraes.

Luís Vicente de Sousa Queiroz, Baron of Limeira 
'Luís Vicente de Sousa Queirós (June 12, 1849 – June 11, 1898) was a Brazilian landowner, agronomist and businessman. He was the founder of the Luiz de Queiroz Higher School of Agriculture (ESALQ), which today belongs to the University of São Paulo. Luís Vicente was born in São Paulo in 1849. He was the fifth among the fifteen children of Vicente de Sousa Queirós, the Baron of Limeira, and Francisca de Paula Souza, his cousin. He was the grandson of Brigadier Luís António de Sousa Queirós , one of the largest landowners in the province of São Paulo, commonly known as "Brigadeiro Luís Antônio", and of Geneva Pais de Barros Leite. 

In 1857, when he was only 8 years old, Luis Vicente was sent to study in Europe, along with one of his brothers. He remained on the European continent for 16 years, having attended the Agricultural Schools in Grignon, France, and that of Zurich, in German Switzerland. He would return to Brazil in 1873, at the age of 24, having inherited the Engenho d'Água farm from his father, in the old Vila de Constituição, today the city of Piracicaba. At the end of the 1870s, he worked on the construction of his Parisian-style mansion, near the Piracicaba River Falls, which he would live in after his marriage to Ermelinda Ottoni(March 21, 1856 – April 7, 1936), daughter of the counselor and senator of the Empire, Cristiano Benedito Ottoni and Bárbara de Barros Ottoni, but the couple had no children.

Entrepreneur and politician, his first business initiative was the weaving company "Fábrica de Tecidos Santa Francisca", named in honor of his mother, a cotton weaving company, taking advantage of part of the waters of the Piracicaba river as a hydraulic potential to move its machines, built in 1874. With 50 imported looms, the factory, from the beginning, employed 70 workers, with a production capacity of 2,400 meters of fabric per day. In a short time, with the farm supplying the cotton and the factory producing fabrics, he achieved considerable fortune. The plant's machinery generated energy for the factory and enabled public lighting in the region, long before the capital of São Paulo. His name is also linked to the first experiences with telephony, in 1882, and the afforestation in the city of Piracicaba. 

Luis Vicente was also a member of the Republican Party and chaired the Piracicaba abolitionist commission. His ideas of abolishing slavery in the "short term" clashed with the conservative fraction of the local ruling class, as the free labor model introduced in his company clashed with the old agrarian and slave-holding culture of the time. Among other party members, similar frictions also occurred, especially between the two republican leaders of Piracicaba. On one side was Luis Vicente, a defender of the immediate abolition of serf labor and, on the other, Prudente de Moraes, who was in favor of gradual emancipation and with compensation to the owners of the enslaved. Luis was forced to keep permanent guards watching over his patrimony, the Santa Francisca fabric factory and the mansion where the family lived in the days before the abolition of slavery. 

After abolition, under the pretext of a vacation trip, Luís Vicente left for Europe. He was strongly influenced by the European ideal of civilization as a model for Brazilian society, based on the technical-scientific revolution to overcome the challenges of the new times. Upon returning to Brazil, he understood that civilization had to be based on education and mobilized efforts to introduce the scientific rationalization of agriculture.

References

External links 
Sala de Sintra link

Heraldrys Institute of Rome link

Imperial Ordem da Rosa link

Baron of Jundiaí link

ESALQ link

Portuguese noble families